The Torneo de Promoción y Reserva is a football tournament in Peru. There are currently 16 clubs in the league. Each team will have a roaster of twelve 21-year-old players, three 19-year-olds as three older reinforcements; whenever they be recorded in the club. The team champion in this tournament will offer two points and the runner-up a point of bonus to the respective regular team in the 2014 Torneo Descentralizado.

Tournament modus
The tournament will be played during both the 2014 Torneo del Inca and 2014 Torneo Descentralizado for a total of 44 games. In the first stage the 16 teams are divided into 2 groups. Both groups play a round-robin home-and-away round for 14 matches. The team ranked first in each group at the end of the round will play the stage final to decide the stage champion and runner-up. The first stage champion and runner-up will receive a two points and one point bonus for the next stage of the tournament. The second stage of the tournament will play a round-robin home-and-away round for a total of 30 matches each. The tournament champion offer two points and the runner-up a point of bonus to the respective regular team in the 2014 Torneo Descentralizado.

Teams

Torneo del Inca

Group A

Group B

Standings

Final
This match was originally scheduled to be played on the same day and place hours before the 2014 Torneo del Inca Final but was postpone to not interfere with two Peru national under-20 football team's friendlies. The champion and runner-up will give its team +2 and +1 point(s) on the tournament's second stage.

Torneo Descentralizado

Standings

Results

Title playoff

See also
2014 Torneo del Inca
2014 Torneo Descentralizado

References

External links 

  
Tournament regulations 
Tournament fixture 
Torneo de Promoción y Reserva news at Peru.com 
Torneo de Promoción y Reserva news at Ovacion.pe 

Res
2014